Mendaro is a town located in the province of Gipuzkoa, in the Autonomous Community of Basque Country, northern Spain.

The Mendaro Valley is the town's namesake. There is little agreement on the origin or meaning of the word itself.

Surrounded by mountains, the town is located in northeast Gipuzkoa near the Biscayan border.

Officially founded in 1983, Mendaro is considered one of Gipuzkoa's youngest municipalities.

In 2015, the population was estimated at 2,026 inhabitants.

References

External links
 Official Website Information available in Spanish and Basque.
 MENDARO in the Bernardo Estornés Lasa - Auñamendi Encyclopedia (Euskomedia Fundazioa) Information available in Spanish

Municipalities in Gipuzkoa